The Riserva Naturale Pian di Spagna e Lago di Mezzola is a nature reserve in Lombardy, Italy. The reserve consists of the Lago di Mezzola and the wetland area which separates it from Lake Como, the Pian di Spagna. It includes parts of the comuni of Sorico and Gera Lario in the province of Como, and of the comuni of Dubino, Verceia and Novate Mezzola in the province of Sondrio. It was established by Deliberazione del Consiglio Regionale III/1913, dated 6 February 1985, and has the EUAP reference code EUAP0326.

References

Nature reserves in Italy
Geography of Lombardy
Tourist attractions in Lombardy